Youth unemployment in Italy discusses the statistics, trends, causes and consequences concerning the topic of unemployment among young Italians.

According to the European Union’s standards, youth unemployment refers to people of age between 15 and 24. Italy displays one of the highest rates of youth unemployment among the 35 member countries of the Organization of Economic Co-Operation and Development (OECD). The Italian youth unemployment rate started raising dramatically since the 2008 financial crisis reaching its peak of 42.67% in 2014. In 2017, among the EU member states, the youth unemployment rate of Italy (35.1%) was exceeded by only Spain and Greece. The Italian youth unemployment rate was more than the double of the total EU average rate of 16.7% in 2017. While youth unemployment is extremely high compared to EU standards, the Italian total unemployment rate (11.1%) is closer to EU average (7.4%).

Statistics 
Youth unemployment in Italy is quantified by many measures. According to the World Bank, the youth unemployment rate is 34.726% as of September 27, 2018. Throughout Italy's history of tracking youth unemployment (1983 to 2018), the average percentage has been 30%. Between 1994 and 2000, youth unemployment averaged 33%  In certain regions of Italy, especially the southern region of Calabria, the unemployment rate is higher than the rest of the country. As of 2017, Calabria has the highest rate of youth unemployment in the country with 55.6% of the population unemployed between the ages of 15 and 24. In contrast, the 2017 statistic for the lowest rate of youth unemployment was recorded in the northern region of Italy in Trentino-South Tyrol at 14.4%. In 2017, nearly 1 in 5 young Italians were considered to be in the group of unemployed, not looking for employment, and not enrolled in school. In 2017, young Italian families were shown to have a stronger chance of living without income or in complete poverty. Nearly 60% of these families belonged to the generalized group of "new entrants", or rather workers that were attempting to join the labor market for the first time. These young Italians and their families are nearly 3.5 times more likely to be unemployed than older Italians. When compared to the ratio of Germany (1.5 times more likely), young Italians have a much higher chance to remain unemployed. Jobs for young Italians are in great demand in Italy, with certain financial positions receiving 85,000 applications and accepting only 30 candidates. Certain Italian hospital positions have received 7,000 applications and accepted only 10 candidates. These examples of limited employment positions are representative of the day-to-day conditions that young Italians face when searching for employment.

Historically, 40.3% of 15–24 year-olds who were actively part of the labor force were unemployed in 2015. 22% of the same population had been unemployed for 12 or more months, meaning more than half of the unemployed active Italian youth had been so long-term. Yet another subset of the youth population is neither in employment nor in education and training (NEET), which in 2015 represented 21.4% of Italy's 15–24 year-olds. In addition to complete unemployment, Italian youth also have high levels of underemployment. The number of 15–24 year-olds who worked full-time (30 hours per week) dropped from 1,597,000 in 2000 to 676,000 in 2015, while the number of part-time workers increased from 172,000 to 237,000 people. Furthermore, 83.7% of the young part-time workers in 2015 did so involuntarily because they could not find full-time employment.

Causes 
Since the recent financial crisis ended, there was an increase in unemployment rates by 20 percent in several nations in Europe. There were soaring rates of youth unemployment across the countries reaching 40 to 50 percent. While poor outcomes of labour market are driven due to general economic state and cyclical factors, wide literature highlighted the crucial role played in institutions of the labour market for unemployment (Nifo & Vecchione, 2014). The generous reflection of benefit systems or highly restricted regulations of employment protection can be blamed for the overall persistence and magnitude of unemployment. Further ahead, some nations tend to perform well with respect to the overall employment in comparison with the youth unemployment. One basic notion of the literature review regarding the impact of institutions on unemployment is relative to the inconclusive state of empirical results. Analysing unemployment specific to age present a number of benefits (Dietrich & Möller, 2016). Most significant are structural variations between older and youth population across the labour market. Labour programs and regulations are highly different all across the globe. Such variety in benefits and regulations raise important questions on public policy regarding the effect of extremely protective programs and regulations on economic results (Gebel & Giesecke, 2011). Several players across the society pay for such protective measures. If employers bare the burden, they are forced to decrease demand for the workforce. Therefore, protective measures have a paradoxical impact to support employment welfare at the cost of unemployment. This specific problems creates major doubt regarding national labour policies. 
Since the last few decades, a number of empirical and theoretical contributions focus on several institutions of labour market for explaining why there are differences in labour market performance across time and nations (Blanchflower et al., 2014). From a theoretical perspective, the institutions of labour market impact the behaviour of labour supply and labour demand, and further impacts the decisions of wage setting and hiring. By establishing comparable data, factors such as labour tax system, employment protection, or unemployment benefit system are centralized to empirical macro-economic researches (Zeilstra & Elhorst, 2014). These researches look for cross- national differential sources in the performance of labour market. Majority of the researchers identified the target variable of unemployment as it was most suitable for reflecting the ability of economy to avoid the possible consequence of involuntary joblessness. As a significant example, a generous system of employment benefit enhance the reservation wage of the unemployed, while improving the quality of job match. Further ahead, the duration and coverage of unemployment benefits has a substantial impact on the macroeconomic state of unemployment (Schmid, 2015). Higher protection of employment will result in lowering firings and hirings, and the prevailing effects are unclear.

Channels of Institutions to Impact Age-Specific Unemployment
Analysing unemployment specific to age presents a number of advantages. The most significant aspects of analyses are structure-based differences between older people and youth across the labour market. There can be interpretations for youth to a specific limit, who have to look for first jobs and gain job considerate human capital and job experience. On the other hand, older people specifically consist of employees with job tenure and experience. Therefore, it is expected that some institutions of labour market impact the older and youth population in different terms (Kawaguchi & Murao, 2014). One significant channel used by institutions to impact age-specific unemployment is employment protection regulations. While these regulations are initiated for protecting older employees, it hinders the entry of youth population in the labour market. The entire impact of EPL over unemployment cannot be estimated easily, but the differential impact on older and youth population specifies the general impact of such regulations. 
One major institutional channel used for affecting age specific unemployment is the educational system (Hipp et al., 2015). The quality held by educational system is significant for explaining cross-cultural differences in youth unemployment. It has been identified by researchers that an effective educational system is helpful to integrate youth people across the labour market for reducing unemployment by the avoidance of youth unemployment period. It has been identified that training the apprentice helps in reducing the duration to locate the first job in Spain. However, there are benefits and costs of training apprentices for companies in Germany. Further ahead, demographic trends play a crucial role in supporting youth unemployment. In the more concrete sense, a large population of youth to prime age people pushes the supply of youth labour (Zeilstra & Elhorst, 2014). These result in higher rates of youth unemployment considering the prime-aged and youth people do not provide effective substitutes for the purpose of production. Italy is a significant example with a rigid and sequential education system under the South European regimes of school-to-work transition.

Past Research Efforts and Results
A number of OECD researches have identified that the legislation of employment protection do not lead towards higher level of unemployment. However, this is possible only during an interaction between other institution based structures, specifically the overall level of centralized collective bargaining (Cracolici et al., 2007). On the other hand, the replacement level of insurance benefits under unemployment impact the rate of unemployment with better advantages from high level of unemployment. According to a past research Nickell (1997), the strict state of employment protection legislation (EPL) does not impact unemployment but it impacts the overall scope of employment, even with the exclusion of women (Basile et al., 2012). Daveri and Tabellini (2000) identified that employment protection legislation has a significant yet negative correlation with unemployment. This suggests that highly restricting legislation is correlated to low level of unemployment. Belot et al. (2001) discovered that EPL is an insignificant factor determining unemployment in maximum regressions. This research further identified that there is no significance of EPL. Further ahead, Baker et al. (2004) explored that the variable of EPL lacks significance across the years, 1960 to 1999 and 1984 to 1994. This became negative in the duration of 1980 to 1999 (Banerji et al., 2014). This fact suggests that strict regulations help in reducing the overall unemployment. For the context of collective bargaining, studies have specified models on the basis of strictly interpreting that intermediate centralization has an impact on unemployment. The models have also been developed by loosely interpreting the negative correlation of high centralization.

Recent Research Developments
There is general skepticism related to data quality on this topic and there are individual efforts to analyse them and they suggest that vast cross-national results reflect high non-reliability (Berlingieri et al., 2014). In the most basic sense, several recent researches incorporated bivariate regression which depicted a highly complex relationship between the rate of unemployment and institutional factors of labour market. While researchers have succeeded in constructing multiple variable regressions regarding the relationship between unemployment rate and labour market institutions, the construction of equally plausible regression seems easy. As a result, recent researches depict that economic evidence regarding the topic is highly inconclusive. The evidence present cannot be used to establish any public policy. Several academic research are making significant contributions to improve the overall measures, but a lot of work still has to be done (Berloffa et al., 2014). Researchers need to focus on more quantitative measures for highlighting the real-life establishments of major institutions in the labour market. These findings will require sufficient standardization across nations with sufficient flexibility in significant national variations. '

Based on the critical analysis of past and present researches, it has been identified that the labour market of Italy is facing extreme flexibility due to two-tier reforms. Families of the youth population play a crucial role to bare the costs of adulthood transition (Etzo, 2011). The questions regarding youth labour market has a number of obscure facets, exacerbating the situation of economic crisis. Italy faced the most difficult aspects of school-to-work transitions, with dramatically relative and absolute drawbacks across the labour market. The evolving state of Italian labour market reforms depict that the education system lack the ability of closing the gap of youth experience instead of an alleged rigid attribute across the labour industry (Blanchflower et al., 2014). 
One specifically worrisome attribute of the youth labour market in Italy is the high ratio between the rate of unemployment among the youth population and the overall rate of unemployment. Since the years of 1980s, Italy faced a high rate of unemployment across the workforce in the age group 15 to 24 years (Brandt & Hank, 2014). The rate exceeded slightly by 30 percent till the 1990s and it further rose in the current crisis reaching 40 percent. The evolving overall rate of unemployment in Italy reflect the double sided attribute of current Italian crisis. There was a rise in unemployment in the year 2009 after it was declining during the years of 2000s. During the initial period of 2010, several factors depicted recovery but with the second hit of the crisis, there was a growth in unemployment to reach the highest rate at 12.4 percent in the year 2013 (De Lange et al., 2014). Different behaviours in the rate of youth unemployment is extremely startling. 
The above figure depicts the series of unemployment among individuals in the age group of 15 to 24 years (Dietrich & Möller, 2016). This reflects that the rate of youth unemployment increased to double (reaching 40 percent from 20 percent) from the years 2008 to 2013. This was highest across all counties of Europe, apart from Spain, Portugal, and Greece. The rate of unemployment across the older population did not increase or decrease in such a manner raising queries regarding if there was a recent enactment of the pension reform. If this was the case, several older employees would have been employed for a long time and this had a short-term influence on the unemployment faced by the youth population (Gebel & Giesecke, 2011). The above figure provides that there is a specifically high ratio of unemployment when compared between youths and adults in Italy. This particular fact clearly indicates that there are youth specific issues in the labour market of Italy. 
Past researchers have indicated that labour market institutes have a significant impact on the subsequent wages and status of employment (Hipp et al., 2015). Therefore, to further complete this analysis, the labour market institutions of Italy will be referred to that impact unemployment in its youth population. In the year 2014, the Law 183 was introduced by the government of Italy, named as the Jobs Act. This legal act helped in determining major changes in terms of industrial relations. This change substantially liberalized the labour industry which resulted in completing the reform process started during the mid-nineties. Following are the key attributes of this act which tend to source unemployment across the youth population of Italy (Kawaguchi & Murao, 2014):
a) Introduction of a new contract category for newly hired employees to remove all obligations for reinstated workers in case they are fired invalidly.
b) Facilitating the utilization of temporary contracts by eliminating past restrictions prior to the implementation of Jobs Act.
c) Weakened state of lawful challenges for businesses with the intention of monitoring the workers by different types of electronic devices. 
The aim of this research was to analyse the impacts of labour market institutions and relative factors on youth unemployment specifically targeting people between the age group of 15 to 24 years and beyond 25 years. The European nation selected for this purpose was Italy and several channels were identified by which institutions impact unemployment specific to age. Past researchers have indicated that labour market institutes have a significant impact on the subsequent wages and status of employment. Therefore, to further complete this analysis, the labour market institutions of Italy were referred to that impact unemployment in its youth population. Based on the critical analysis of past and present researches, it has been identified that the labour market of Italy is facing extreme flexibility due to two-tier reforms. Families of the youth population play a crucial role to bare the costs of adulthood transition. The questions regarding youth labour market has a number of obscure facets, exacerbating the situation of economic crisis. 
Labour programs and regulations are highly different all across the globe. Such variety in benefits and regulations raise important questions on public policy regarding the effect of extremely protective programs and regulations on economic results. Several players across the society pay for such protective measures. There are principle benefits of more education. However, several evidences have indicated that rapidly increased population of graduates since the university reform not only increased the temporary rate of unemployment. On the other hand, it made significant contribution to render highly competitive job search across college graduates. In conclusion, it can be stated that the evolving state of Italian labour market reforms depict that the education system lack the ability of closing the gap of youth experience instead of an alleged rigid attribute across the labour industry.

Transition from Education to Employment 
One of the primary causes of youth unemployment in Italy is the transition period between school and work. The Italian education system is unable to transition students from studying to gaining work experience. Once finished with education, young Italians are without experience in the employment market. Their inexperience is due to insufficient contact between the secondary education in Italy and the labor market, specifically in the way recent graduates lack vocational training. Recent graduates lack proper training and work experience for post-graduate employment, and statistically receive a lower mean level of education compared to European counterparts. One reason for the failure of the transition period is the effect of the 2008 recession. During and after 2008, more and more young Italians entered into education, causing a decrease in the labor market and subsequently a higher rate of future unemployment. This increase in students resulted in more competition when searching for employment among college graduates. Many, if not most of the students who graduated from secondary education in Italy were overqualified for the jobs available to them, especially jobs in manufacturing and exporting. A result of this situation seen today is that many of the youth of Italy are limited to either temporary work or unemployment. By 2010, temporary contracts accounted for 50% of the youth in Italy, which only facilitated the churning of unemployment and increased the transition period between going back to school and finding a full-time job.

Flawed Education System - History 
Before 2005, the time period between graduating from school and the gap between obtaining employment was 51.3 months, which is much higher than the EU average of 30 months. Graduates are then overqualified for the labor market, meaning they have a higher skill level than what is in demand (called a vertical mismatch). Young non-university graduates consequently experience higher rates of unemployment (45%) than their degree-holding counterparts (25.6%).

Welfare system and labor market policy 
Italy's problem of youth unemployment is also caused by its protectionist welfare system and labor market. In 2015, 62.4% 15–24 year-olds who were registered unemployed for 6–11 months did not receive any benefits or assistance; the same rate measured in the population of 15–74 year-olds was 52.4%. Though this demonstrates that benefits are exclusive for people of all ages in Italy, the young unemployed are left out at a rate 10% higher than the general population. This can be attributed to the country's corporatist structure; similarly to Greece, Spain, and Portugal (grouped into the "Southern Model" of European welfare) benefits in Italy are distributed in a very fragmented manner according to occupation. There are separate benefit schemes, or "micro-schemes", for specific private and public sectors, types of self-employment, and the large group of industrial workers called INPS. This system is split into the core group of labor market insiders receives generous benefits (such as pensions), while the irregular workers receive minimal benefits. For example, upon retirement an institutional worker would receive a pension of 89% their average net earnings, but a non-institutional worker would receive only 19%. Paradoxically, this "economic protection" model makes it difficult for young people to get their first job because they have never been part of the labor market. To illustrate, the unemployment benefits given to an Italian 18 year-old who has never had a job is 0% of average net earnings. In addition to receiving nonexistent/minimal benefits, a study also found youth were excluded based on factors including: the prerequisites for coverage, the age coverage is extended to, and sanctions for incorrectly using the system. Italy's model has exclusive unemployment benefits coupled with inflexible labor market policy (which means workers have high employment protection and are unlikely to be fired), which creates inhospitable conditions for young people seeking jobs.

Consequences

Emigration 
In the last years, the media in Italy increasingly addresses the issue of the international migration flows of young people as a phenomenon of brain drain. The high rate of unemployment encourages young citizens to leave the country. In fact, the main reason of the high numbers of young people leaving the country is the prospect of job opportunities abroad. Qualified Italians who choose to emigrate to Northern Europe are able to make between 29% and 48% more than their counterparts who remain in Italy. Youth emigration as a consequence results in the Italian government losing its investments in education and a considerable amount of young labor force. In the majority of the cases, the young unemployed emigrate to either other countries in Europe (mainly the United Kingdom and Germany) or to the United States and Australia. In 2016, more than 39% of Italian emigrants were of age between 18 and 34. Additionally, the percentage of young Italian emigrants is increasing every year at a steady rate.

North-South Division 
It is often argued that Italy is made up of two different economies, one belonging to the North and one to the South. In terms of youth unemployment, there is a regional divide between North and South within Italy. In 2016, Italy presented one of the most internally diverse regional unemployment rates among the EU member states (together with other Southern European countries such as Greece and Spain). More than half of the young population was unemployed in the southern regions of Italy (Calabria, Campania, Puglia and Sicilia). On the other hand, unemployment rates in the northern regions (such as Lombardia, Piemonte and Veneto) varied between 5% and 10%.

See Also
 Youth unemployment
 Unemployment benefits in Italy
 Labor policy in Italy
 Youth unemployment in Spain
 Youth unemployment in the United Kingdom
 Unemployment in the United Kingdom

Notes 

Economy of Italy
Labor in Italy
Italy
Unemployment